The Pedralbes Circuit was a  street racing course in Barcelona, Catalonia, Spain.

First opened in 1946 in the western suburbs of the city, in the Pedralbes neighbourhood, the course featured wide streets and expansive, sweeping corners; both drivers and racing fans loved the course. The circuit hosted the Penya Rhin Grand Prix four times (1946, 1948, 1950 and 1954.). The circuit also hosted the Spanish Grand Prix in 1951 and 1954 Due to stricter safety rules following the 1955 Le Mans disaster, the Pedralbes Circuit was permanently retired as a racing venue.

Lap records
The fastest official race lap records at the Pedralbes Circuit are listed as:

Notes

References

External links
Pedralbes Circuit (1946–1954) on Google Maps (Historic Formula 1 circuits)

Pedralbes
Formula One circuits
Spanish Grand Prix
Defunct motorsport venues in Spain
Les Corts (district)